Bhramaram is a 2009 Indian Malayalam-language road suspense thriller film, written and directed by Blessy, starring Mohanlal, Lakshmi Gopalaswamy, Suresh Menon, Murali Gopy, and Bhumika Chawla. The film was released on 25 June 2009. It was an average grosser at the box office.

Plot
Unni is a share broker in Coimbatore and leads a comfortable life with his wife Latha and daughter Lakshmi / Lechu. Into the cosiness of such a living intrudes a stranger who introduces himself as Jose.

Cashing in on Unni's forgetfulness, Jose goads him into believing that he is Unni's 7th grade classmate. However, a sense of insecurity pervades, with the unwelcome guest – alcoholic and somewhat eccentric – pitching for an extended stay. Unni's misgivings about the 'mystery man' and his ulterior motives prove true, when his confidant and classmate, Dr. Alex Varghese, on consultation, reaffirms his doubts that they had no schoolmate in the name of Jose.

Soon, they discover to their horror that the stranger is that man whose arrival they have been dreading for a long time now, Sivankutty. It is eventually revealed that Unni and Alex ruined Sivankutty's life by framing the latter for a murder which they had committed. The duo realizes that it is payback time and that they are at the receiving end. Sivankutty compels Unni to accompany him back to his village and confess the crime to Sivankutty's wife and daughter, who have left him after they found out the secret than he has been in jail. Midway, Unni decides to abandon the plan of meeting Sivankutty's family and attempts to come back to Coimbatore but is threatened to accompany him. Alex joins Unni in meeting Sivankutty's family. Unni and Alex confess their crime to Sivankutty and finally agree to tell the truth about the murder to his wife and daughter.

However, when they reach his house, they find out that his wife and daughter have already passed away. Sivankutty reveals that his intention of bringing them to his town was to kill for revenge, but he changes his mind and lets them go back.

Cast

Soundtrack 

The soundtrack features two songs composed by Mohan Sithara, with lyrics by Anil Panachooran.

Release
The film was released on 25 June 2009.

Reception
The film got mostly positive reviews. The film was widely appreciated for Mohanlal's performance. Many directors had commented on the style of making and maintaining suspense. The film got overwhelmingly positive reviews from critics. The film was dubbed in Telugu under the same title.

Awards
Kerala State Film Awards
 Best Child Artist – Baby Niveditha

Filmfare Awards South
 Filmfare Special Jury Award – Mohanlal

Asianet Film Awards
 Best Actor – Mohanlal
 Best Child Artist     – Baby Niveditha
 Best Cinematographer  – Ajayan Vincent
 Best Editing          – Vijay Sankar

Annual Malayalam Movie Awards (Dubai)
 Best Artistic Movie
 Best Actor            – Mohanlal
 Best Child Artist     – Baby Niveditha
 Best Cinematographer  – Ajayan Vincent
 Best Background Score – Mohan Sithara

Amrita Mathrubhumi Film Awards
 Best Cinematographer – Ajayan Vincent

State Film Critics Awards
 Best Child Artist – Baby Niveditha

Vanitha Film Awards
 Most Popular Actor – Mohanlal
 Best Cinematographer – Ajayan Vincent

Kairali TV – World Malayali Council Film Awards
 Best Actor – Mohanlal

Federation of Film Societies
 Special Jury Award (Director) – Blessy

Jaihind TV Film Awards
 Best Director – Blessy
 Best Music Director – Mohan Sithara

Jaycee Award
 Best Actor – Mohanlal

South Cine Awards'''
 Best Director – Blessy

Surya TV Film Awards
 Best Cinematographer – Ajayan Vincent
 Best Child Artist – Baby Niveditha

The Sathyan Memorial Film Awards
 The Best Supporting Actor – Murali Gopy

References

External links
 
 

2000s Malayalam-language films
2000s thriller films
Indian road movies
2000s road movies
Films shot in Coimbatore
Films directed by Blessy